Francesco Porcia or Francesco Apollodoro (Porcia in the Friuli, 1531 - Padua, 1612) was an Italian painter, chiefly of portraits in Padua. He is suspected to have been the son or grandson of the painter Paolino Apollodoro.

References

External links

17th-century Italian painters
Italian male painters
1531 births
1612 deaths
Painters from Padua
People from Friuli